Ikembara is a village in southeastern Nigeria. Also, it is located near the city of Owerri in Ikeduru local Government Area.

Villages in Igboland
Towns in Imo State